Max Decugis and André Gobert defeated Samuel Hardy and James Cecil Parke 6–2, 6–1, 6–2 in the All Comers' Final, and then defeated the reigning champions Major Ritchie and Anthony Wilding 9–7, 5–7, 6–3, 2–6, 6–2 in the challenge round to win the gentlemen's doubles tennis title at the 1911 Wimbledon Championships.

Draw

Challenge round

All comers' finals

Top half

Section 1

Section 2

Bottom half

Section 3

Section 4

References

External links

Men's Doubles
Wimbledon Championship by year – Men's doubles